"Tush", censored as the alternate title "Push", is the first single by Ghostface Killah off the album The Pretty Toney Album and features vocals by Missy Elliott. The song samples "Naked Truth" by The Best of Both Worlds.

Lyrical content
The song is explicitly about sex, and contains complex lyrics, word play, and fast tempo delivery. Both of which being a staple of the duo's previous solo outputs.

Reviews
"Tush" was the subject of many mixed reviews. One reviewer felt the song helped Ghostface's push into the mainstream, while others felt the clean, over-production was at odds with Ghost's irrepressible street credibility.
Starpulse however felt the song showed both Missy and Ghost in top form and called the wordplay clever.

Track listing
 "Tush"
 "Tush" (instrumental)
 "Run"

Charts

See also
 List of number-one dance singles of 2004 (U.S.)

References

2004 singles
Ghostface Killah songs
Missy Elliott songs
Dirty rap songs
2003 songs
Def Jam Recordings singles
Songs written by Ghostface Killah